The 1996 Great Britain Lions tour was a rugby league tour by the Great Britain team which took place from September to November 1996. The tour included games in Papua New Guinea, Fiji and New Zealand, however due to the ongoing Super League war and with the Australian team under the control of the Australian Rugby League, the team did not play any matches in Australia. The tour was generally considered as a disaster, with Great Britain failing to win any games in New Zealand, and several players being sent home early from the tour in order to cut costs.

Touring squad
Great Britain coach Phil Larder selected a 32-man squad to take on the tour. A notable omission from the squad was Martin Offiah, who took part in the previous three Great Britain tours, but had told Larder he did not have the enthusiasm for another six-week tour. Several changes were made to the initial squad selected, as Gary Connolly, Lee Jackson and Jason Robinson were informed they would not be allowed to play due to their contracts with the ARL. There were also a number of other withdrawals, with John Bentley returning to rugby union, and Shaun Edwards, Paul Newlove and Steve McNamara all ruled out due to injury.

Former Wigan second row forward Denis Betts, who was playing with the New Zealand-based Auckland Warriors in the Australian Rugby League premiership, made history with his selection. The 25 test veteran became the first player selected to tour while playing in the Australian premiership and not in the English premiership.

Larder's assistant coaches on the tour were Clive Griffiths and Gary Hetherington and the tour manager was Phil Lowe. Andy Farrell was appointed as the tour captain, with Denis Betts named as vice-captain.

Papua New Guinea

Fiji

New Zealand

First Test

2nd Test

3rd Test

References
General

Specific

External links
1996 Great Britain Tour of the Pacific at wigan.rlfans.com
New Zealand vs Great Britain 1996 at rugbyleagueproject.org

Great Britain national rugby league team tours
Rugby league tours of New Zealand
Rugby league tours of Papua New Guinea
Fiji–United Kingdom relations
New Zealand–United Kingdom relations
Papua New Guinea–United Kingdom relations
Great Britain Lions tour
Great Britain Lions tour
Great Britain Lions tour
Great Britain Lions tour
Great Britain Lions tour